Holy Ghost is the third studio album by the American rock band Modern Baseball, released on May 13, 2016 on Run for Cover Records.[3] The album follows their third EP, The Perfect Cast, which was released on October 23, 2015, via Lame-O Records, as well as their sophomore studio album, You're Gonna Miss It All, released in 2014, and their compilation album, Techniques, also released in 2014.

Background 
Holy Ghost is the first Modern Baseball album that was not recorded by the band themselves—instead, the members obtained the help of Joe Reinhart (Hop Along, Algernon Cadwallader). The album was recorded at Headroom Studios in Philadelphia.[8] The album is split in half between both guitarist/frontmen, Jake Ewald and Bren Lukens (Ewald wrote the first six songs and Lukens wrote the last five).[9][10] Ewald's songs mainly revolved around the passing of his grandfather while Lukens focuses on their struggles with mental illness and depression.[11]

Release and promotion 
On February 24, 2016, the album was officially confirmed. On March 3, two songs were published online for free via NPR. The first, "Everyday", was written by Jake Ewald and the second, "Apple Cider, I Don't Mind", was written by Bren Lukens.[12] On April 4, the band released a documentary directed by actor and director Kyle Thrash entitled "Tripping in the Dark".[11] The documentary focused mainly on the formation of the band and the making of the album, including Ewald's struggle with his grandfather's death and Lukens' near suicide attempt and subsequent recovery. The video for "Wedding Singer" was released on May 5.[13]

The Vinyl release of the album is unique in that the sides are titled Side J and Side B named after Jake Ewald having written the songs on side A and Bren Lukens having written the songs on side B. Additionally the Vinyl release includes an undocumented hidden track on side B of the vinyl release. This track is not found on any other release. 

Modern Baseball announced plans to tour on March 3, 2016, setting the first dates for shortly after the release of the new album. The tour kicked off on May 25, 2016, with Joyce Manor and Thin Lips opening. On August 3, Modern Baseball announced that they would be supporting Brand New and The Front Bottoms on tour starting in October 2016. At the conclusion of the Brand New tour, Modern Baseball will be playing a string of shows internationally.

Critical reception 

The album was met with universal acclaim reviews, most of them noting that Modern Baseball showed growth and maturity with the content of Holy Ghost. Holy Ghost holds a score of 81/100 on Metacritic indicating universal acclaim. On June 4, 2016, Holy Ghost reached No. 53 on the US Billboard 200.

Accolades

Track listing

Personnel
Jacob Ewald – vocals; guitars; keyboards
Ian Farmer – bass; vocals; keyboards
Sean Huber – drums; vocals; percussion
Bren Lukens – vocals; guitars
Cameron Boucher – additional vocals (track 7)
 Joe Reinhart – producer; recording engineer
Mark Quinlan – drum technician
Ryan Schwabe – mastering engineer
Kyle Pulley – editing
Drew Taurisano – studio assistant
Shane Woods – studio assistant
Isabel Imperatore – layout
Jessica Flynn – photography

Charts

References 

2016 albums
Modern Baseball albums
Run for Cover Records albums